César Borja Pineda (born 21 September 1934) is a Mexican former freestyle swimmer who competed in the 1948 Summer Olympics and in the 1952 Summer Olympics.

References

1934 births
Living people
Mexican male freestyle swimmers
Olympic swimmers of Mexico
Swimmers at the 1948 Summer Olympics
Swimmers at the 1952 Summer Olympics
Competitors at the 1954 Central American and Caribbean Games
Central American and Caribbean Games gold medalists for Mexico
Central American and Caribbean Games medalists in swimming